The starry triggerfish (Abalistes stellaris), or flat-tailed triggerfish, is a tropical, harmless, oviparous bottom dweller, characterized by some white spots along the spinal dark band. The tail is dorsoventral and looks very thin, when looked upon in profile. There is a deep groove in front of the eye. The background colour is grey with olive green spots. Its mitochondrial DNA has been sequenced by the University of Tokyo, Japan. Male adults grow up to 60 cm.

Taxonomy
The name of the species was proposed in 2004 to be changed to Abalistes stellatus . FishBase considers Abalistes stellatus a misapplied name and accepts it as a separate species.

Abalistes stellaris was also differentiated from the closely related species Abalistes filamentosus in 2004.

Habitat
Indo-West Pacific up to the Red Sea and East Africa
mud, silty sand bottoms, coral reefs

Diet

Benthic animals such as crustaceans, crabs, mollusks; bony fish.

Economic use

It is used in aquaculture, as food (fresh or dried), and for leather.

References

Balistidae
Taxa named by Marcus Elieser Bloch
Taxa named by Johann Gottlob Theaenus Schneider
Fish described in 1801